Robert Curry Cameron (1925–1972) was an American astronomer.

Cameron was the son of M. W. Cameron, of Indianapolis, Indiana. He completed an undergraduate degree at Purdue University and a graduate degree in astronomy at Indiana University.

On April 20, 1950, he discovered the minor planet (1575) Winifred at Brooklyn, Indiana. He named the body for Winifred Sawtell, who became his wife and colleague Winifred Cameron. He edited The Magnetic and Related Stars, a collection of papers presented at a 1965 symposium in Greenbelt, Maryland. The lunar crater Cameron was named after him, by his wife.

References

1925 births
1972 deaths
American astronomers
People from Indianapolis
Indiana University alumni